Tungkal River is a river in Jambi province, Sumatra island, Indonesia, about 700 km northwest of the capital Jakarta.

Geography
The river flows in the southwest area of Java with predominantly tropical rainforest climate (designated as Af in the Köppen-Geiger climate classification). The annual average temperature in the area is 24 °C. The warmest month is September, when the average temperature is around 26 °C, and the coldest is December, at 22 °C. The average annual rainfall is 2907 mm. The wettest month is December, with an average of 410 mm rainfall, and the driest is June, with 137 mm rainfall.

See also
List of rivers of Indonesia
List of rivers of Sumatra

References

Rivers of Jambi
Rivers of Indonesia